Ellen Julia Gould (29 March 1860 - 19 July 1941) was an Australian nurse. She was the first lady superintendent of the Army Nursing Service Reserve, attached to the New South Wales Army Medical Corps, from 1899, and served in this role during the Boer War. After operating a private hospital for several years, she then served in World War I as matron of No.2 Australian General Hospital, both in Egypt and in France.

She was played by Rhondda Findleton in the 2014 miniseries ANZAC Girls.

References

Further reading
 

1860 births
1941 deaths
Australian women nurses
Australian military nurses
19th-century Australian women
20th-century Australian women